HXD3B (Chinese: 和谐电3B型电力机车) is a class of electric locomotives for heavy freight service built by Bombardier Transportation and CNR Dalian Locomotives.

History 

The Ministry of Railways of the People's Republic of China (MOR) ordered 500 locomotives in February 2007 for €1.1 billion (US$1.4 billion) from Dalian Locomotives and Bombardier Transportation, with Bombardier's share amounting to €370 million (US$480 million).  The first unit, HXD3B0001 was delivered on 29 December 2008 in Dalian, the entire order of 500 machines will be delivered by the end of 2011.

Technical details 

The HXD3B is based on the Bombardier-produced MTAB Iore twin-section locomotives, but is a single-section locomotive with cabs at both ends. The electronics were updated, with traction converters based on IGCT technology, and an updated version of the MITRAC control electronics developed by Bombardier's Switzerland branch.

The electronics and traction equipment of the first 150 units were supplied by Bombardier from Europe, production for the rest is shared between Bombardier's Chinese subsidiary and Dalian. The design of the mechanical components was subject to technology transfer from Bombardier to Dalian.

Gallery

Named locomotive
 HXD3B-1893: "Mao Zedong"

References

25 kV AC locomotives
Co-Co locomotives
HXD3B
CRRC Dalian locomotives
Railway locomotives introduced in 2009
Standard gauge locomotives of China